This is a list of the National Register of Historic Places listings in Box Elder County, Utah.

This is intended to be a complete list of the properties and districts on the National Register of Historic Places in Box Elder County, Utah, United States.  Latitude and longitude coordinates are provided for many National Register properties and districts; these locations may be seen together in a map.

There are 43 properties and districts listed on the National Register in the county. Another 3 sites in the county were once listed, but have since been removed.



Current listings

|}

Former listings

|}

See also
 List of National Historic Landmarks in Utah
 National Register of Historic Places listings in Utah

References

External links

 
Box Elder